Qubodiyon District or Nohiya-i Qubodiyon is a district in Khatlon Region, Tajikistan. Its capital is the town Qubodiyon. The population of the district is 188,100 (January 2020 estimate).

Administrative divisions
They are as follows:

Notes

References

Districts of Khatlon Region
Districts of Tajikistan